The bar-necked cuckoo-dove, also called the dusky cuckoo-dove was split into the following species in 2016. The name "bar-necked cuckoo-dove" remains valid when used to describe the Macropygia magna species complex as all of its members have barred necks and breasts.
 Timor cuckoo-dove,	Macropygia magna
 Tanimbar cuckoo-dove,	Macropygia timorlaoensis
 Flores Sea cuckoo-dove, 	Macropygia macassariensis

References

Birds by common name